The Melanopsichiaceae are a family of smut fungi in the order Ustilaginomycetes containing three genera.

References

External links

Ustilaginomycotina
Basidiomycota families